The 1989–90 Serie A season was another successful year for Napoli, with Diego Maradona being among the leading goalscorers in Serie A (16 goals), behind Marco van Basten of Milan (19 goals) and Roberto Baggio of Fiorentina (17 goals). But while Baggio's Fiorentina narrowly avoided relegation, Maradona's Napoli won their second Serie A title in four seasons, while Van Basten helped Milan retain the European Cup as compensation for their failure to win the Serie A title, having finished two points behind Napoli. Demoted to Serie B for 1990–91 were Udinese, Hellas Verona, Cremonese and Ascoli. In Europe, Sampdoria won the Cup Winners Cup and Juventus the UEFA Cup, making this year the most successful in Italian football history.

Teams
Genoa, Bari, Udinese and Cremonese had been promoted from Serie B.

Final classification

Results

Top goalscorers

References and sources

Almanacco Illustrato del Calcio - La Storia 1898-2004, Panini Edizioni, Modena, September 2005

External links
 :it:Classifica calcio Serie A italiana 1990 - Italian version with pictures and info.
  - All results on RSSSF Website.

Serie A seasons
Italy
1989–90 in Italian football leagues